Sēme Parish is an administrative unit of Tukums Municipality in the Courland region of Latvia. The administrative center is Sēme.

Towns, villages and settlements of Sēme parish 
 Kaive
 Brizule
 Rideļi
  – parish administrative center

See also 
 Kaive Oak

References

External links

Parishes of Latvia
Tukums Municipality
Courland